The 2019 Alsco 300 was a NASCAR Xfinity Series race held on May 25, 2019, at Charlotte Motor Speedway in Concord, North Carolina. Contested over 200 laps on the 1.5-mile (2.4 km) asphalt speedway, it was the 11th race of the 2019 NASCAR Xfinity Series season.

Background

Track

The race was held at Charlotte Motor Speedway, which is located in Concord, North Carolina. The speedway complex includes a  quad-oval track, as well as a dragstrip and a dirt track. The speedway was built in 1959 by Bruton Smith and is considered the home track for NASCAR, as many race teams are based in the Charlotte metropolitan area. The track is owned and operated by Speedway Motorsports Inc. (SMI), with Marcus G. Smith serving as track president.

Entry list

Practice

First practice

Final practice

Qualifying

Qualifying results

Race

Summary

Stage Results

Stage One
Laps: 45

Stage Two
Laps: 45

Final Stage Results

Stage Three
Laps: 110

Due to the extreme heat, Austin Dillon did not complete the race and during a caution, he was replaced by Daniel Hemric. Since Dillon started the race, he is officially credited with the 28th-place finish.

References

2019 in sports in North Carolina
Alsco 300
NASCAR races at Charlotte Motor Speedway
2019 NASCAR Xfinity Series